D106 is a state road connecting the mainland to island of Pag and terminating in Žigljen ferry port, from where Jadrolinija ferries fly to the mainland, docking at Prizna and D406 state road. The road is 73.8 km long.

D106 is the main road route on the island of Pag. The southern terminus of the road is located in Posedarje, at an intersection with D8 state route - the Adriatic Highway. The road uses Pag Bridge as a crossing between the mainland and Pag Island.

The road also comprises an interchange with A1 motorway in Posedarje interchange.

The road, as well as all other state roads in Croatia, is managed and maintained by Hrvatske ceste, a state-owned company.

Traffic volume 

Traffic is regularly counted and reported by Hrvatske ceste (HC), operator of the road. Furthermore, the HC report number of vehicles using Prizna-Žigljen ferry line, connecting D106 to the D406 state road. Substantial variations between annual (AADT) and summer (ASDT) traffic volumes are attributed to the fact that the road connects a number of summer resorts to Croatian motorway network.

Road junctions and populated areas

Sources

State roads in Croatia
Lika-Senj County
Transport in Zadar County
Pag (island)